Shape is the characteristic surface configuration of a thing; an outline or contour.

Shape may also refer to:

Fictional characters
 The Shape Japer, a villain on the BBC television series Numberjacks.
 Michael Myers (Halloween) or The Shape, a fictional character from the Halloween horror film franchise
 Shape (comics), a fictional character in the Marvel Comics universe

Media
 Shape (magazine), a fitness magazine
 The Shape (book), a 2000 poetry collection by Dejan Stojanović
 "Shapes" (The X-Files), an episode of the TV series The X-Files

Art
 Shape (visual arts), a flat, enclosed area of an artwork

Music

Performers
 The Shapes (UK band), a 1970s punk rock band
 The Shapes, a UK experimental pop band fronted by Micachu
 The Shapes (US band), a 2000s American band that wrote and performed the theme song for the TV series Dallas SWAT

Albums
 Shape (album), a 1996 album by Frente!
 Shapes (album), a 1997 album by Polvo
 Shapes, a 1994 album by Greg Howard

Songs
 "Shape" (song), a song by Sugababes
 "Shapes", a song by The Long Winters from When I Pretend to Fall
 "The Shape", a song by Slipknot from Iowa

Companies and organizations
 Supreme Headquarters Allied Powers Europe (SHAPE), the central command of NATO military forces, Casteau, Belgium
 SHAPE America, working name of the Society of Health and Physical Educators, American organisation
 SHAPE Services, a German software vendor
 Shape Arts or simply Shape, a charity funded by Arts Council England

Food
 Arnott's Shapes, a line of snack foods
 Blancmange or shape, a sweet dessert

Other
 Shape (Go), a description of positional qualities of a group of stones in the game of Go
 SHAPE (molecular biology), Selective 2'-hydroxyl acylation analyzed by primer extension, a chemical-based RNA structure determination experiment
Social Sciences, Humanities and the Arts for People and the Economy (SHAPE), an acronym for these academic disciplines

See also
 Shapefile, a geospatial vector data format for geographic information systems software
 Shape extension, in the X/Window System
 Shape:UK or Shapeshifters, a 2000s-2010s house music production duo
 The Shapes Project, an art project by Allan McCollum